Lhasa railway station is a railway station in Lhasa, Tibet Autonomous Region, China.

Location

The railway station lies in Niu New Area, Doilungdêqên District, 1 kilometer to the south of the Lhasa River and 5 kilometers southwest of the Potala Palace.

The Liuwu Bridge links central Lhasa to Lhasa railway station and the newly developed Niu New Area on the south bank of the Lhasa River.
The bridge is one of the notable structures of the  Qinghai–Tibet Railway, the highest railway in the world.

Schedules 
In addition to the Qinghai-Tibet Railway, the station is served by the Lhasa–Xigazê railway to Shigatse in western Tibet. The station will also be the future terminus of the Sichuan–Tibet railway from Chengdu, with the first section to Nyingchi opened in June 2021 and the full line planned to open in 2030.

As of 2020, there are nine daily departures: two to Xigazê and seven via Xining. Of these, one terminates, and the remaining six each continue to one of the following destinations: Beijing West, Chengdu, Chongqing West, Guangzhou, Lanzhou, Shanghai.

Track layout 
The Lhasa passenger railway station is large compared to current needs, containing four tracks serving two island platforms under one roof. There is space for one more island platform and three more tracks.

A departure indicator displays information regarding the next four trains scheduled to depart in both Chinese and Tibetan. The times and train numbers are in Latin alphanumeric characters.

Gallery

See also 
 Qingzang railway
 List of stations on Qingzang railway

References

Sources

External links 

 Lhasa Railway Station construction completed 

Railway stations in Tibet
Transport in Lhasa
Doilungdêqên District
Railway stations in China opened in 2006
Stations on the Qinghai–Tibet Railway
Stations on the Lhasa–Xigazê Railway